Narsingh Rao Dikshit  is an Indian politician. He was elected to the Lok Sabha, lower house of the Parliament of India from the Bhind constituency of Madhya Pradesh  as a member of the Bharatiya Janata Party.

References

External links
Official biographical sketch in Parliament of India website

Lok Sabha members from Madhya Pradesh
India MPs 1989–1991
Bharatiya Janata Party politicians from Madhya Pradesh
1920 births